

Heinrich August Ottokar Reichard (1751-1828) was a German author and theatre director. He was born in Gotha.

Works
 

 
 2nd ed., 1802
 3rd ed., 1805 (3 vol.)
 5th ed., 1807 
 6th ed., 1810
 7th ed., 1812
  1816-1818. + via HathiTrust
 vol. 1: (part 1) Îles Britanniques, Danemarck, Suède et Russie; (part 2) Pays-Bas, Allemagne
 vol. 2: France part 1, part 2
 vol. 3: Suisse
 vol. 4: (part 3) Italie, Hongrie, Turquie, Espagne et Portugal
 9th ed., 1819-1821
 11th ed., 1824

Translations of Reichard's work
  + index

References

Bibliography

External links
 
 WorldCat
 

1751 births
1828 deaths